The Commons at the University of Maryland, Baltimore County is the central student activities center of the university campus. Opened in 2002, "The Commons" includes meeting rooms, food and retail outlets and a book store. Also incorporated into the building is a gameroom, facilities for the student government association, a campus pub, bank and a copying center. In addition, The Commons hosts numerous events such as Quadmania, Big Crazy Fun Night, orientations, fraternity events, and much more.

Layout and design
The Commons was built on the foundation of the former Gym 1 building. The north–south segment of the building is referred to as "Main Street" for it is where multiple student fairs and events are held, and the east–west segment of the building is referred to as "Market Street" since it transverses the main Food Court.

Centers and Student Life
The Commons includes a variety of student life offices to serve the student body of UMBC. The Campus Information Center (CIC), Center for Off-Campus Student Services (OCSS), the Student Events Board (seb), Student Government Association (SGA), the Mosaic Center, and the Women's Center are all located in The Commons.

Shopping
The Commons provides the majority of shopping and eatery options for the campus, along with the University Center's Starbucks and Chick-fil-A in the University Center.

Bookstore
The official UMBC bookstore is housed on the first floor of The Commons. Established in 1966, the bookstore is a non-profit, non-state funded, self-support, auxiliary, retail operation owned and operated by UMBC. The store sells a wide range of items ranging from apparel to electronics.

On the ground floor of the bookstore, the Yum Shoppe serves as a convenience store for the students and faculty on the campus.

Food Court
The Commons contains numerous eateries within the Food Court along "Market Street". They include: 
Au Bon Pain, Italian Cuisine, Jow Jing & Olo Sushi, Outtakes, Salsarita's, Fresh Fusions Vegan Cuisine, Wild Greens, Mondo's Subs, and
Mesquite Ranch BBQ & Grill.
Other establishments include the campus' pub, Flat Tuesdays, and The Fireside Lounge on the third floor.

Future plans
According to the 2009 Master Plan, plans call for another student center entitled the "Student Life Building". This building is proposed to be located to the north of The Commons along Erickson Field. This building will add additional student space, as well as reinforce the student core of the campus.

References

University of Maryland, Baltimore County
Student activity centers in the United States